Sapone is a surname. Notable people with the surname include:

Marcela Sapone (born 1986), American entrepreneur
Mike Sapone, American record producer, composer, audio engineer, and mixer